Grzegorz Wedzynski (Hebrew: ודז'ינסקי; born 4 June 1970 in Poland) is a Polish footballer who now plays for AC ‘t Rozeke.

Career
Wedzynski started his senior career with MKP Pogoń Siedlce. In 1995. he signed for ŁKS Łódź in the Polish Ekstraklasa, where he made thirty league appearances and scored six goals. After that, he played for Polonia Warsaw, Maccabi Tel Aviv, Hapoel Rishon LeZion, Hapoel Ironi Kiryat Shmona, Górnik Łęczna, Narew Ostrołęka, MKP Pogoń Siedlce, Icon, and Polonia New York Soccer Club.

References

External links 
 
 Grzegorz Wędzyński: playing in Israel is the best time in my career
 Grzegorz Wędzyński yesterday, today, and tomorrow
 WEDZINSKI: In the past, Maccabi players would not have looked that way 
 Grzegorz Wędzyński: I wanted to return to Konwiktorska Street 
 Grzegorz Wędzyński for 2x45.com.pl: If Cani will be better than others, why not play?

1970 births
Living people
Polish footballers
Polish football managers
Polonia Warsaw players
Legia Warsaw players
ŁKS Łódź players
Maccabi Tel Aviv F.C. players
Hapoel Rishon LeZion F.C. players
Hapoel Ironi Kiryat Shmona F.C. players
Górnik Łęczna players
MKP Pogoń Siedlce players
Poland international footballers
Polish expatriate footballers
Expatriate footballers in Israel
Polish expatriate sportspeople in Israel
Ekstraklasa players
Israeli Premier League players
Liga Leumit players
MKP Pogoń Siedlce managers
Association football midfielders